The Indian Journal of International Law is a quarterly law review published by Springer Science+Business Media on behalf of the Indian Society of International Law. It was established in 1960 and the editor-in-chief is B. S. Chimni (Jawaharlal Nehru University).

External links 
 
 Journal page at society website

Indian law journals
Quarterly journals
Publications established in 1960
Springer Science+Business Media academic journals
English-language journals